Susan Collett RCA IAC is a Canadian artist in printmaking and ceramics. In 1986, she graduated from the Cleveland Institute of Art, earning a B.F.A. in printmaking with a minor in ceramics.

Early life and career
Collett began formal arts education in 1980 at the Central Technical School, graduating in 1982. She then began studies at the Cleveland Institute of Art, graduating with a B.F.A. in 1986, following with an apprenticeship as studio assistant to American ceramic artist Judith Salomon.

Working professionally since 2003, Collett maintains a full-time production studio in downtown Toronto where she creates large-scale clay sculpture and prints. Her ceramic work employs paper clay and nichrome wire substrate. Her monoprints are made from plates of stitched industrial-grade copper.

Career 
Collett's work has been featured in the Toronto International Art Fair, SOFA exhibitions in Miami, Chicago and New York, Gyeonggi International Ceramic Biennale 2009 Korea and the Taiwan Ceramics Biennale among others.

In 2009, Collett was invited by the Ceramic Artists Association of Israel to conduct a master workshop in Neot HaKikar near the Dead Sea, as well as exhibiting at the Gardiner Museum of Ceramic Art, China Academy of Art, and Concordia University. Her work has appeared in Ceramic Review, Ceramic Art & Perception, and Canadian Art. Collett is recognized as an important contributor to Canadian Studio Ceramic practice, as well as internationally recognized for her contributions to development in ceramic technique.

Awards 
 2019       Toronto Arts Council, Research Grant, Porcelain
 2019       Canada Council for the Arts, Artist Abroad program -  Werkschule, Oldenburg Germany
 2017       Ontario Arts Council, Project Grant, Clay
 2015       Honorable Mention, 8th Gyeonggi International Ceramic Biennale, Korea, juried, International 
 2009       Honorable Mention, 5th Cebiko Korean International Clay Biennale, Korea, juried, International
 2002       2nd Prize, Ernst & Young Great Canadian Printmaking Competition, juried, National
 2001       1st Prize, Winifred Shantz Award, Canadian Clay & Glass Gallery, juried, National
 1997       Nick Novak Scholarship, Printmaking, Open Studio, Toronto
 1994       Sheila Hugh Mackay Foundation Grant  New Brunswick, clay, juried, National
 1986       1st Place, Agnes Gund Memorial Award, BFA Show, Cleveland Institute of Art, USA

Collections 
 Arizona State University Art Museum, USA (2021) 
 Kasturbhai Lalbhai Museum, India (2016) 
 Canada House, Trafalgar Square London (2015)
 Montreal Museum of Fine Arts (2015)
 The Four Seasons Hotel, Toronto (2012)
 Canadian Clay and Glass Gallery (various)
 Sèvres Porcelain Museum, Paris, France
 Trump Tower Hollywood, Miami (2010)
 The Canadiana Collection of the Official Residencies of Ottawa, Rideau Hall (2009) 
 The Gardiner Museum of Ceramic Art (2008)
 The Tom Thomson Art Gallery (2006)

Elected associations 
She received her letters from the International Academy of Ceramics in 2007, and from the RCA, Royal Canadian Academy of Arts in 2008.

Exhibitions 
 Boise Art Museum, Idaho, USA, Summer 2021 opening
 Fuller Craft Museum, Boston, Massachusetts USA, January 7-May 30, 2021
 Brennpunkt Keramik II, curated from the Hannelore Sieffert Collection, Neunkirchen Kultur-Gesellschaft, Germany, Summer 2020
 Nora Eccles Harrison Museum of Art 2020, Utah State University, International Exhibition: Particle & Wave - Paper Clay Illuminated, January 24-May 2, 2020
 Arizona State University Art Museum, Tempe Arizona, USA June 22- September 21, 2019
 Daum Museum of Contemporary Art, Sedalia Missouri, USA October 12-December 15, 2019
 Internationale Keramiktage Oldenburg Ceramic Fair, Germany, Guest Artist Solo Exhibition, August 1-5, 2019
 Sandra Ainsley Gallery, Toronto, Concurrents, solo, clay & prints (2017)
 Karl & Helen Burger Gallery, Kean University, Three Canadian Artists Reflect on the Natural World, NJ, U.S.A.(2016)
 Master Ceramists, Galerie Elena Lee, Montreal, 3-person invitational, clay & prints (2016)
 Belger Art Center, Kansas City, Mo. U.S.A., NCECA group invitational, Linda Lighton curator (2016)
 SOFA Chicago, Barbara Silverberg, Montreal, group, clay (2015)
 Toronto International Art Fair, Sandra Ainsley Gallery, Toronto, gallery artists feature (2015)
 Gyeonggi 5th International Ceramic Biennale, Korea, international juried, honorable mention (2015)
 Naked Craft, International touring, Art Gallery Burlington, On, Materia, Quebec City, Art Gallery Nova Scotia, Scotland (2015)
 Toronto International Art Fair, Sandra Ainsley Gallery, Toronto, Gallery Artists Feature (2014)
 Gardiner Museum, Why Make in China? Invitational, clay (2012)
 Taiwan International Ceramics Biennale, Taipei, Yingge Museum, international juried (2012)
 New Mexico Museum of Art, Santa Fe, New Mexico, “New World: Timeless Visions”, international juried (2012)
 International Triennale of Silica Arts, Kecskemet, Hungary, international juried (2011)
 Canadian Clay & Glass Gallery, Ontario, Invitational, Terra Firma “Groundbreakers in Canadian Clay”(2011)
 Sèvres Porcelain Museum, Paris, France, International Academy of Ceramics, group, clay (2010)
 Cebiko, 5th World Ceramic Biennale, Korea, international, juried (2009)
 Tom Thomson Memorial Gallery, Ontario, Canada “Traverse” Solo, clay & prints (2008)
 Palm Beach 3, International Art Fair, Palm Beach Florida, Galerie Elena Lee, clay (2006)
 Fletcher Challenge Ceramics Award, New Zealand, international juried, clay (2000)

Publications 
 Louisa Taylor, UK, 2011, The Ceramics Bible, USA Edition, Chronicle Books, page 74
 Emmanuel Cooper, UK, 2009, Contemporary Ceramics, Thames & Hudson page 89
 Guy Lavigueur, QC. 2016, Ateliers/Studios of Royal Canadian Academy of Arts, Marquis Imprimer, Quebec, page 122, 123
 Ed Phillips, Canada, 2005, Ernst & Young Great Canadian Printmaking Collection, Ernst & Young LLP, page 37, 48

Exhibition catalogues 
 Brennpunkt Keramik II, 2020 catalogue, cover image & page 20
 Desire, Feb-May 2016, Kansas City, Missouri, Belger Art Centre, pages 8, 13, 28, 29
 Three Canadians Reflect on the Natural World, November 2016-January 2017, Kean University Art Galleries, pages 5, 6, 10-31, 68, 69
 Naked Craft Canada/Scotland, June 2015/ April 2016, Art Gallery of Burlington, Centre Materia, Art Gallery of Nova Scotia, Scotland (various) pages 42, 43
 Canadian Art Installation 2015, Aimia Canada, May 2015, pages 24, 45, 109, 171
 Canada House Trafalgar Square, Canadian High Commission to the UK, February 2015, Trafalgar Square, London UK, page 90
 GICB 2015, 8th Gyeonggi International Ceramic Biennale, 2015, Icheon World Ceramic Centre, Korea, pages 96, 97
 Caméléon, October 2015, McClure Gallery, Montreal, pages 14–27
 Toronto International Art Fair, October 2013, Toronto Convention Centre, Canada, pages 44, 45
 Taiwan International Ceramics Biennale, 2012, New Taipei City, Yingge Ceramics Museum page 97
 Circuit Ceramique a Sèvres, September 2010, Sèvres Porcelain Museum, page 146
 Ceramic Visions, April 2009, International, 5th World Ceramic Biennale, Gyeonggi Province, Korea, pages 111, 241

Articles 
 Brennpunkt Keramik II, 2020 catalogue, Introduction Essay by Monika Gass, Curator: Nicole Nix-Hauck- Stadtische Galerie, Neunkirchen, Germany
 Hannelore Sieffert, Winter 2019, New Ceramics: The European Ceramics Magazine, Germany, Volume #3, page 54
 Nathalie Roy, winter 2014-2015, “La Ceramique d’art Contemporaine: Le contre-pied des idees recues, Vies Des Arts, issue 237, pages 72, 73
 Heidi McKenzie, April 2013, “Go East” Canadians Create in China, Ceramics Monthly, USA, volume 61 #4, pages 45–47
 Barry Morrison, June 2014, Studio Ceramics Canada, Online
 Adina Balint-Babos July–August 2011, “Figuration & Abstraction” Ceramic Review UK, Issue 250, pages 60–63
 Kristen den Hartog, November 2008 – April 2009,  “Canadians in China”, Ceramics Technical, Australia, Issue 27, pages 83–88
 Kristen den Hartog, March- May 2007 “Impluvium”, Ceramics Art & Perception, Australia, Spring Issue 67, pages 52–54
 Virginia Eichhorn, Spring 2007, Impluvium, Espace Sculpture, QC Spring Issue 79, pages 37, 38
 Kristen den Hartog, August 2006, “Air & Grace”, Ceramic Review, UK, Issue 220, pages 28–29

References

External links 
 
 Contemporary Canadian Art database(CCCA)
 International Academy of Ceramics (IAC)
 Studio Ceramics Canada
 Sandra Ainsley Gallery Toronto
 Oeno Gallery, Ontario

1961 births
Artists from Toronto
Canadian ceramists
Canadian printmakers
Canadian women artists
Living people
Canadian sculptors
Canadian women sculptors
Canadian contemporary artists
21st-century ceramists
Canadian women ceramists
Women printmakers
Members of the Royal Canadian Academy of Arts